Alicia Zubasnabar de De la Cuadra (July 15, 1915 – June 1, 2008), also known as "Licha", was an Argentine human rights activist. She was one of the twelve founding members of the Grandmothers of the Plaza de Mayo and served as the first President of the organization. She has been named as a "prominent woman" by the Argentine National Congress and as an "illustrious citizen" by Corrientes Province.

Biography 

Alicia Zubasnabar de De la Cuadra was born in the small town of Sauce, Corrientes Province, in 1915. While living there she married Roberto Luis De la Cuadra and had five children with him. In 1945 they moved to settle in La Plata city, capital of Buenos Aires Province.

During the military dictatorship named by its leaders as the National Reorganisation Process (1976-1983) her husband, a worker at the Propulsora Siderúrgica (Iron and Steel Propellent) in Ensenada, her son Roberto José and her daughter Elena, who was pregnant, and her sons-in-law Héctor Baratti and Gustavo Ernesto Fraire were abducted, along with her grandson who was later recovered. It would later be discovered that her granddaughter was born in captivity on June 16, 1977, named Ana Libertad by her mother. Except for her grandson, none of them were ever seen again.

Monseñor Emilio Graselli, private secretary to the army chaplain Mons. Adolfo S. Tortolo, who had a register listing many abducted individuals and particularly with information on the fates of children born in captivity, told her that her son had died and that her daughter was being held under arrest.

A year later, Alicia received news of the birth of her granddaughter and of the deplorable conditions under which her daughter and son-in-law were suffering:

The judges systematically refused to start any sort of investigative activities. Shortly afterwards, thanks to the negotiations of that Italian Jesuit order, Monseñor Mario Pichi intervened, meeting with Colonel Rospide Rospide to ask him if he could give the child to its grandmother. The Colonel replied:

Grandmothers of the Plaza de Mayo 

The coup d'état of March 24, 1976, established a regime of state terrorism based on the forced disappearance of the opposition and the imposition of an atmosphere of terror designed to avoid complaints. At that time, the family members of the disappeared were completely defenceless and powerless, as neither any of the world's democracies, nor the Catholic Church, nor international humanitarian organisations were ready to condemn the atrocities committed by the military regime and on the contrary even cooperated with this illegal repression in some cases. Nor was it possible to call on the judiciary system for help.

Under these conditions a group of mothers, fathers and other family members of the disappeared started a nonviolent resistance movement which made history. The idea was put forward by Azucena Villaflor, later kidnapped and murdered by the dictatorship:
 On April 30, 1977, they began marching every Thursday around the Pirámide de Mayo in the square of the same name, located opposite the House of Government. To call attention to themselves, the women decided to cover their heads with white cloth. The group quickly became known as the Mothers of the Plaza de Mayo, and by their simple presence they began to exert national and international pressure on the question of the fates of those who disappeared in Argentina. Amongst these mothers and grandmothers was Alicia Zubasnabar de De la Cuadra, "Licha", who had started to participate in the marches in September 1977 along with her husband and Hebe de Bonafini.

At that time, another mother and grandmother, María Isabel Chorobik de Mariani or "Chicha", had started looking for other mothers of the disappeared who were, like her, looking for their grandchildren. Mariani had been pushed towards joining up with other grandmothers by Lidia Pegenaute, a lawyer working as an advisor to minors in the courts of La Plata, where she had tried without success to find a solution to her case. In the second half of 1977 Mariani went to see De la Cuadra at her house in La Plata:

That same day, Chicha and Licha made the decision to form a group of grandmothers and unite those whom they knew from the Thursday marches in the Plaza de Mayo.

The twelve founding mothers and grandmothers were María Isabel Chorobik de Mariani, Beatriz H. C. Aicardi de Neuhaus, Eva Márquez de Castillo Barrios, Alicia Zubasnabar de De la Cuadra, Vilma Delinda Sesarego de Gutiérrez, Mirta Acuña de Baravalle, Haydee Vallino de Lemos, Leontina Puebla de Pérez, Delia Giovanola de Califano, Raquel Radio de Marizcurrena, Clara Jurado y María Eugenia Casinelli de García Irureta Goyena. Licha Zubasnabar was the group's first president. They were initially known as the "Argentinian Grandmothers with Disappeared Grandchildren", but in 1980 they became legally organised under their publicly recognised name, "Grandmothers of the Plaza de Mayo".

The subgroup of "The Mothers" understood that the situation of the children kidnapped by security forces was different from that of their parents, and that specific strategies and methods were needed for their recovery. "Search for our grandchildren without forgetting our children" was the motto which united them.

During the military dictatorship and despite the risks, the Grandmothers of the Plaza de Mayo began investigations in order to find their grandchildren, without abandoning the search for their children, at the same time as starting a national and international public awareness campaign focusing on their missing grandchildren and the dictatorship's systematic kidnapping of children.

Once democracy was restored on December 10, 1983, the grandmothers promoted the use of the most recent genetic advances to establish a system for identifying their stolen grandchildren, a system unprecedented in the world, and pressured the state into indicting those responsible for the kidnapping of children, considering them to be part of a plan of repression.

In 1984, the Grandmothers became a civil non-profit association, with Alicia stepping down as president and the role passing on to María Isabel de Mariani (Chicha). At that time, her husband had just died. From then on, Alicia continued as the group's spokeswoman. By 2008, the Grandmothers of the Plaza de Mayo had recovered 88 grandchildren. It is estimated that, in total, about five hundred children born between 1975 and 1980 were kidnapped.

See also 
 Dirty War
 Operation Condor
 Mothers of the Plaza de Mayo
 Grandmothers of the Plaza de Mayo

References

Sources 
 
 
 

1915 births
2008 deaths
Grandmothers of the Plaza de Mayo
Argentine human rights activists
Women human rights activists
People from Sauce, Corrientes
People from La Plata
Burials at La Plata Cemetery